The WindRider 10 (also WindRider Tango) is a trimaran sailboat manufactured by WindRider LLC, designed by Mark Balogh and WindRider LLC and introduced in 2002. Production had ended by 2020.

The design features an adjustable seat and a kick-up aluminium rudder.

See also
 List of multihulls

References

Trimarans
Sailboat types built by WindRider LLC